The Washington Nationals are an American professional baseball franchise based in Washington, D.C. They are members of the National League (NL) East Division in Major League Baseball (MLB). There have been 18 different managers in the franchise's history. The team has played its home games at the Nationals Park since 2008. The Nationals are owned by Ted Lerner, with Mike Rizzo as their general manager.

The Expos' first manager was Gene Mauch, who managed for six seasons. Felipe Alou is the franchise's all-time leader in regular season games managed (1,408) and regular season game wins (691). Jim Fanning is the only Expos manager to have gone into the post-season. Karl Kuehl, Jim Fanning, and Tom Runnells have all spent their entire MLB managing careers with the Expos/Nationals. After Manny Acta was fired during the  season, Jim Riggleman, the bench coach, was named interim manager to replace him, and was promoted to the position full-time for the  season. After Riggleman resigned during the  season and John McLaren ran the team for three games as an interim manager, the team hired veteran manager Davey Johnson, who had previously served as an advisor to Rizzo. Johnson led the team to the  National League East title and the franchise's first playoff berth since moving to Washington and was 2012's NL Manager of the Year, but the team did not advance past the 2012 National League Division Series. Johnson retired after the  season.

Key

Managers
Notes: Managers from 1969 through 2004 are of the Montreal Expos; those from 2005 to the present are of the Washington Nationals. Statistics are correct as of the end of the 2021 Major League Baseball season.

Notes 
 A running total of the number of managers of the Expos/Nationals. Thus, any manager who has two or more separate terms as a manager is only counted once.
 Frank Robinson was inducted into the Baseball Hall of Fame in 1982 as a player, but was never inducted into the Hall of Fame as a manager.

References 
General
 
 
Specific

 
Washington Nationals
Managers
Washington Nationals managers